Branko Vukelić (9 March 1958 – 3 May 2013) was a Croatian politician and former Minister of Defence, and member of the Croatian Democratic Union.

Vukelić graduated from the University of Zagreb, Faculty of Electrical Engineering, in 1981.  He was married with one child.

References

External links
 Biography at the Government of the Republic of Croatia website
 Biography at HDZ 
 "Ex-defence and economy minister Vukelic dies", article at Croatia Herald, May 3, 2013; accessed May 22, 2013.

1958 births
2013 deaths
People from Karlovac
Croatian Democratic Union politicians
Faculty of Electrical Engineering and Computing, University of Zagreb alumni
Defence ministers of Croatia
Economy ministers of Croatia